Jorge Fernández may refer to:

Jorge Ariel Fernández (born 1982), Argentine association footballer who plays for FC Gossau
Jorge Fernández Díaz (born 1950), Spanish minister of Home Affairs (2011–ongoing)
Jorge Fernández Madinabeitia (born 1972), Spanish TV presenter and model. Former Mister Spain 1999
Jorge Fernández Menéndez, Mexican journalist and radio presenter
Jorge Fernández (athlete) (born 1987), Cuban discus thrower and 2008 Olympian
Jorge Fernández (equestrian) (born 1968), Uruguayan Olympic equestrian
Jorge Fernández Valcárcel (born 1989), Spanish volleyball player
Jorge Fernández Lucas (born 1992), Spanish footballer
Jorge Hugo Fernández (born 1942), Argentine footballer
Jorge Fernandez (tennis coach) Ecuadorian-Canadian tennis coach

See also
Jorge Fernandes (disambiguation)